Édgar Ernesto García (born October 4, 1996) is a Dominican professional baseball pitcher for the Frederick Atlantic League Team of the Atlantic League of Professional Baseball. He made his Major League Baseball (MLB) debut with the Philadelphia Phillies in 2019 and has also played for the Tampa Bay Rays, Cincinnati Reds, and Minnesota Twins.

Professional career

Philadelphia Phillies
García was born in Sabana Grande de Palenque, Dominican Republic. He worked out as a shortstop for Phillies scouts initially in the Dominican Republic, but though his batting skills did not impress the scouts they liked his arm. He was signed as an international free agent as a pitcher by the Philadelphia Phillies on May 29, 2014, for $30,000.

He made his professional debut in 2014 with the DSL Phillies, going 2–0 with a 2.10 ERA in 25.2 innings. García played for the Gulf Coast Phillies in 2015, going 1–2 with a 3.31 ERA and 34 strikeouts in 32.2 innings.

García played for the Lakewood BlueClaws in 2016, going 4–1 with a 2.80 ERA in 61 innings. He played for the Clearwater Threshers in 2017, going 3–4 with a 4.47 ERA and 89 strikeouts in 88.2 innings.

2018–2020
In 2018, García split the season between the Reading Fightin Phils and the Lehigh Valley IronPigs, he was 7–2 with a 3.64 ERA, and 72 strikeouts in 64.1 innings. He was an Eastern League Mid-season All Star, was 4th in the league in appearances with 47, and among qualifying league relief pitchers he had the 4th-best opposing batting average, at .204, and the 5th-best SO/9.0 IP rate, at 10.26. He then pitched for Estrellas Orientales of the  Dominican Winter League during the 2018 offseason. The Phillies added him to their 40-man roster after the 2018 season.

He opened the 2019 season back with Lehigh Valley, and before García was called up he was 1–1 with a 1.65 ERA and 23 strikeouts in 16.1 innings.  On May 6, he was called to the major league roster and made his major league debut that night. In 2019 with Lehigh Valley he was 2-1 with 8 saves and a 2.48 ERA in 25 relief appearances in 29.0 innings in which he struck out 38 batters (11.8 strikeouts per 9 innings). In 2019 with the Phillies he was 2-0 with a 5.77 ERA in 37 relief appearances in which he pitched 39.0 innings and struck out 45 batters (10.4 strikeouts per 9 innings).

García was designated for assignment by Philadelphia on August 13, 2020.

Tampa Bay Rays
On August 16, 2020, García was traded to the Tampa Bay Rays in exchange for Rodolfo Sanchez. He was called up by the Rays on August 23 after Nick Anderson was placed on the injured list. In 4 games with Tampa Bay, García struggled to a 10.80 ERA. On December 2, García was nontendered by the Rays.

Cincinnati Reds
On December 23, 2020, García signed a one-year, $600,000 major-league contract with the Cincinnati Reds. On April 1, 2021, García was designated for assignment after Jonathan India was added to the 40-man roster. He was outrighted to the alternate training site on April 3, and was assigned to the Triple-A Louisville Bats to begin the year, where he pitched to a 3.38 ERA in 24 games. On July 19, García was selected to the active roster. In 5 appearances for the Reds, Garcia struggled to a 16.62 ERA with 4 strikeouts. On July 28, Garcia was designated for assignment by the Reds.

Minnesota Twins
On July 30, 2021, Garcia was claimed off of waivers by the Minnesota Twins. On August 31, the Twins outrighted Garcia off of their 40-man roster and sent him outright to the Triple-A St. Paul Saints. Garcia elected free agency on October 13.

On April 20, 2022, García signed with the Mariachis de Guadalajara of the Mexican League. However, he was released on April 27, 2022, without having made an appearance for the club.

Washington Nationals
On June 6, 2022, García signed a minor league contract with the Washington Nationals organization. García spent the remainder of the year with the Double-A Harrisburg Senators, posting an 0-2 record and 6.38 ERA with 15 strikeouts in 24.0 innings pitched. He elected free agency following the season on November 10.

Frederick Atlantic League Team
On March 10, 2023, García signed with the Frederick Atlantic League Team in the Atlantic League of Professional Baseball.

Pitching Style
García is known for an excellent 87 mph slider that has hard, downward action and generates more whiffs/swing compared to other pitchers' sliders.

References

External links

1996 births
Living people
Dominican Republic expatriate baseball players in the United States
Major League Baseball players from the Dominican Republic
Major League Baseball pitchers
Philadelphia Phillies players
Tampa Bay Rays players
Cincinnati Reds players
Minnesota Twins players
Dominican Summer League Phillies players
Florida Complex League Phillies players
Lakewood BlueClaws players
Clearwater Threshers players
Reading Fightin Phils players
Lehigh Valley IronPigs players
Estrellas Orientales players